James Thompson Collinsworth (1802 – July 11, 1838) was an American-born Texian lawyer and political figure in early history of the Republic of Texas.

Early life
Collinsworth was born in 1802 Davidson County, Tennessee. His father, Edward Collinsworth, served in the American Revolutionary War and the War of 1812. His sister, Susan, married Mark R. Cockrill, a large planter known as the "Wool King of the World".

Career
Collinsworth served as the United States Attorney for the Western District of Tennessee.

Collinsworth served as a signer of the Texas Declaration of Independence, the first chief justice of the Supreme Court of the Republic of Texas, and an interim Secretary of State of Texas.

Collinsworth was candidate during the 1838 Republic of Texas presidential election against Mirabeau B. Lamar.

Death and legacy
Collinsworth drowned after falling from a steamboat into Galveston Bay. His body was found on Bolivar Peninsula and taken by boat upstream along Buffalo Bayou to Houston, where he lay in state at the Texas Capitol. He was interred at Founders Memorial Cemetery in Houston.

Collingsworth County, Texas and Collingsworth Street in Houston, were both posthumously named in his honor, even though both were misspelled.

References

External links

Founders Memorial Park at The Political Graveyard

Republic of Texas Senators
1st Congress of the Republic of Texas
1806 births
1838 deaths
Chief Justices of the Republic of Texas Supreme Court
Deaths by drowning in the United States
Secretaries of State of Texas
Texas Attorneys General
United States Attorneys for the Western District of Tennessee
People of the Texas Revolution
People from Brazoria County, Texas
People from Davidson County, Tennessee
Signers of the Texas Declaration of Independence